The Hollywood Derby is a Grade I American Thoroughbred horse race held annually in late November/early December.  Now held at Del Mar racetrack in San Diego, California, until 2014 it was held at Hollywood Park Racetrack in Inglewood, California. The race is open to horses aged three and contested at a mile and an eighth on turf. It currently offers a purse of $300,000.

Inaugurated in 1938, the race has been a Grade I event since 1973 when grading was first introduced. There was no race from 1942 through 1944 as a result of World War II and it was not run in 2005 as a safety precaution after new grass had been planted on the turf course. It was contested in two divisions from 1981 through 1987.

Known as the Westerner Stakes from 1948–1958, the race was held at Santa Anita Park in 1949 after a fire destroyed the Hollywood Park grandstand and clubhouse. When Hollywood Park closed in December 2013, the race was transferred to Del Mar.  Due to the layout of the turf course at Del Mar, the race was shortened to  miles.

Only five fillies have ever won the race: Busher (1945), Honeymoon (1946), A Gleam (1952), De La Rose (1981) and Royal Heroine (1983).

In 2014, California Chrome accomplished a rare feat when, having won the Santa Anita Derby, Kentucky Derby and Preakness Stakes on dirt earlier in the year, he won the Hollywood Derby in his first appearance on the turf.

The Hollywood Derby has been contested at various distances on both dirt and turf:
  miles on dirt : 1945, 1950, 1976–1980
  miles on dirt : 1938–1941, 1946–1949, 1951–1972
  miles on turf : 1973–1975
  miles on turf : 1981–2002
  miles on turf : 2003 to 2013
  miles on turf:  2014 to present

Records
Speed  record: on turf
 1:45.82 – Super Quercus (1999) (at current distance of 1⅛ miles)
 1:59.35 – Showing Up (2006) (at previous distance of 1¼ miles)
 2:27.80 – Amen II (1973) (at previous distance of 1½ miles)

Speed  record: on dirt
 1:59.40 – Count of Honor (1956) (at 1¼ miles)
 1:47.40 – Codex (1980) (at 1⅛ miles)

Most wins by a jockey:
 8 – Bill Shoemaker (1951, 1955, 1957, 1958, 1974, 1976, 1982, 1986)

Most wins by a trainer:
 4 – Charlie Whittingham (1967, 1969, 1986, 1989)

Most wins by an Owner:
 2 – Louis B. Mayer (1945, 1946)
 2 – Connie M. Ring (1976, 1982)
 2 – Mary Bradley (1986, 1989)
 2 – Klaravich Stables (1997, 2016)

Winners

* In 2001, Designed for Luck won but was disqualified for drifting out in the stretch and was set back to fifth.

References

Grade 1 stakes races in the United States
Flat horse races for three-year-olds
Open middle distance horse races
Turf races in the United States
Recurring events established in 1938
Del Mar Racetrack
Hollywood Park Racetrack